Jonathan Macartney Ball,  AADip RIBA FRSA Hon FRIAS (born 1947) is the co-founder of the Eden Project in Cornwall, UK. 

He was appointed MBE for services to architecture in 1992 and is an occasional public speaker.

He is the author of The Other Side of Eden (FootSteps Press, 2014). and The Winds Call No Man Sir (FootSteps Press, 2015)

Founder: The Great Atlantic Way, Cornwall

Chartered Architect and Writer.

Early life

Born Bude Cornwall 4 June 1947. First and foremost a Cornishman. Educated Bude C of E Primary School and Truro School

Married in 1974 to Victoria Blood, two daughters Jemima Veryan  and Morwenna Victoria.
3 Grand children, Alex Ball, Lamorna Luckhurst and Piran Ball

Professional career

Professional Training The Architectural Association London 1965-1972.

Fron 1974-2002 Principal, The Jonathan Ball Practice, Chartered Architects, Bude, Cornwall.

Council :Royal Institute Of British Architects (RIBA)

Elected to and sat on RIBA Council 1981-1999 then 2015 - 2018:-

1981 Member British Cultural and Scientific Delegation to Romania:

He served as Chairman RIBA Parliamentary Affairs (1982-1987) (RIBA Vice President Parliamentary Liaison 1983-1985):

RIBA Honorary Secretary 1988 -1991 then 1993 -1995.:

RIBA Vice President Membership 1991-1993:

Senior Vice President 1992:

Appointed MBE for Services to Architecture 1992:

Trustee British Architectural Library 1988-1995 then Trustee British Architectural Trust Board 2015- 2018:

There was controversy during the 2018 RIBA Council election for the Vice Presidents, when Ball was reported to the police for harassment following an email sent to Ghana-born candidate Elsie Owusu, copied to all fellow Trustees of RIBA Council, and subsequently published in full by the Architects Journal; the police concluded there was no case to answer.

Worshipful Company Of Chartered Architects (WCCA) City of London Livery:-

Freeman 1987:Liveryman 1989: WCCA Master 2007-2008.

The Eden Project, Bodelva, Cornwall.

With Tim Smit initiated and co-founded Eden as a social enterprise flagship project with which Britain would celebrate the Millennium, co-author of the EdenProject Trust Deed and founding Director, Eden Project Ltd.

Ball and Smit took huge personal risks as co-founders in the creation and delivery of the architectural and environmental vision.

Ball was removed from Eden by the second generation Trustees against his will. Without due recompense, he lost his Architectural practice of 25 years standing. Three appearances in the Royal Courts Of Justice over four years followed to save his name, his family home, and professional reputation. He won his case for proper recognition of his intellectual property and legal status as the co-founder and remains a passionate Eden Project advocate.

The Great Atlantic Way, Cornwall.(GAW)

Ball project founded the GAW, as a follow on from the ideas enshrined in Eden, and as a creative forum for social enterprise to support the economic regeneration of Cornwall’s rural communities through development of the visitor economy and associated business and educational opportunities. It has continued as a focus for ideas on how to achieve advantage out of high-value landscape in low prosperity areas to achieve sustainable futures to fragile low economic areas such as Cornwall.

A major capital project in collaboration with the Meteorological Office and Government Office South West was shelved in 2006.

At the same time, The Great Atlantic Way philosophy was shared with Failte Ireland to assist their Western Development Tourism Programme and was adopted in Ireland as The Wild Atlantic Way. This has achieved international brand status as a leading Irish visitor destination initiated to secure the future of rural communities on Ireland’s Atlantic Coast.

In 2016 the GAW initiated and collaborated with the RIBA in creating the RIBA Spirit Of Place Bude as an exemplar of how communities establish sense of place, identity and belonging in a globalised world.

In 2021 the GAW by invitation presented ideas for creating Cornish Legacy from the G7 Heads Of Government Meeting hosted in Cornwall June 2021. The Solar Power From Space update of the original GAW philosophy in collaboration with Challenger Astronaut Dr Paul Scully-Power remains under review by HMG as a contribution to the debate on  the future of Planet Earth.

ROYAL NATIONAL LIFEBOAT INSTITUTION (RNLI)

In 1966 Ball was a founder volunteer joining the crew of the Bude Lifeboat back on Station for the first time since 1918.He served as volunteer crew on the Lifeboat 1966- 1993 retiring on his 46 th birthday, having served the previous 8 years as Senior Helmsman. Ball then served the Station as Deputy Launching Authority 1993- 2007 after which he served on RNLI Council 2007-2013.In 2002 he was co author of the RNLI Beach Lifeguard Programme which brought the RNLI into patrolling the beaches of Britain and extending their charitable mission of saving lives.

RNLI Awards and Commendations:

Twice recipient of commendation letters from RNLI Chief Of Operations

1993 letter of commendation Director RNLI

1993 RNLI Certificate Of Service Velum 1966-1993

1993 commendation Station Hon Sec retiring as ‘The Last Of The First’.

2002 Queens Golden Jubilee Medal for services to the RNLI.

2002Appointed Bard of Gorsedh Kernow for services to the RNLI and Surf Life Saving In Cornwall

SURF LIFE SAVING GREAT BRITAIN (SLSGB)

1959–present Bude Surf Life Saving Club (appointed Life Member 1984)

1984 SLSGB Long Service Award (1959-1984)

2000-2009 President SLSBG

2006-2008 Chairman of the Great Britain bid to host Rescue 2010, the World Life Saving Championships under the Bid Patronage Of HRH Duke Of Edinburgh.

2010 Surf Lifesaving Australia:Certificate Of Appreciation- in recognition of outstanding support for and contribution to SLS Australia.

Publications

2014 The Other Side Of Eden. Footsteps Press

2016 The Winds Call No Man Sir . Footsteps Press

References

1947 births
Living people
Architects from Cornwall
Members of the Order of the British Empire